Seven Dials may refer to:

Seven Dials, Brighton, a junction of seven roads in the Prestonville area of Brighton, England, United Kingdom
Seven Dials, London, a junction of seven roads in the Covent Garden area of London, England, United Kingdom
Seven Dials Jazz Club, a jazz venue located in the Covent Garden area
The Seven Dials Mystery, a murder mystery by Agatha Christie set in the Covent Garden area
The Duchess of Seven Dials, a 1920 silent film set in the Covent Garden area
"Seven Dials" (2point4 Children), episode 33 in series 5 (1995) of the BBC TV series 2point4 Children
Seven Dials, a non-fiction imprint of Orion Publishing Group
Seven Dials (Roddy Frame album)